Paenirhodobacter is a genus of bacteria from the family of Rhodobacteraceae with one known species (Paenirhodobacter enshiensis). Paenirhodobacter enshiensis has been isolated from soil.

References

Rhodobacteraceae
Bacteria genera
Monotypic bacteria genera